Cabinet of Ewa Kopacz was the government of Poland from 22 September 2014 to 16 November 2015. It was appointed by President Bronisław Komorowski on 22 September 2014, and passed a vote of confidence in Sejm on 1 October 2014. Led by Ewa Kopacz, it is a centre-right coalition of two parties: liberal conservative Civic Platform (PO) and the agrarian Polish People's Party (PSL). Ewa Kopacz succeeded Donald Tusk, who was nominated as President of the European Council.

Cabinet 

Kopacz, Ewa
Cabinet of Ewa Kopacz
Cabinet of Ewa Kopacz
2014 establishments in Poland
Cabinets established in 2014
2015 disestablishments in Poland
Cabinets disestablished in 2015